Clayton Bellamy is a Canadian singer-songwriter

He grew up in Bonnyville, Alberta before his family settled in Nashville, Tennessee.

He has won many awards including a Juno for Best Country Recording, a five time Canadian Country Music Award winner Canadian Country Music Awards, and SOCAN Songwriter of the Year award, Radio Mysic Award song of the year, five CMAB awards for song, video, Entrrtainer, Group, and Roots Artist. Clayton has dominated the stage performing at the Grand Ole Opry has been featured in People Magazine The New York Times and Rolling Stone and even performed for President Carter.  He has released five solo studio records and has had songs recorded by Big Sugar Matt Anderson Grady Dan Davidson Jason Blaine W3apons FKB Willie Mack The Standstills, Hayley Jensen and many more. 
Bellamy is also one of the three members of the group The Road Hammers, the highest selling Canadian Country group in Canadian history. They have released five  studio albums, in addition to charting twelve singles in Canada with two number one singles and two in the United States with Montage Records He is Currently touring with The Road Hammers and his rock n roll band Clayton Bellamy & The Congregation they Have released two Albums. And the current single “Soundtrack to the End of the World” is top 20 on The Active Rock charts in Canada.

Discography

Studio albums

Singles

Music videos

Awards 
 1 SOCAN Songwriter of the Year
 4 CCMA Award 
 1 Juno Award Best Country Recording
 Western Canadian Music Award for Best Country Recording
 Radio Music Award Recipient

References

External links
 
 The Road Hammers Official

Living people
Canadian country singer-songwriters
Canadian male singers
Year of birth missing (living people)
Canadian male singer-songwriters